A Generation is a 1955 Polish film directed by Andrzej Wajda. It is based on the novel Pokolenie by Bohdan Czeszko, who also wrote the script. It was Wajda's first film and the opening installment of what became his Three War Films trilogy set in the Second World War, to be followed by Kanał and Ashes and Diamonds.

Plot
A Generation is set in Wola, a working-class section of Warsaw, in 1942 and tells the stories of two young men at odds with the German occupation of Poland. The young protagonist, Stach (Tadeusz Łomnicki), is living in squalor on the outskirts of the city and carrying out wayward acts of theft and rebellion. 

After a friend is killed attempting to heist coal from a German supply train, he finds work as an apprentice at a furniture workshop, where he becomes involved in an underground communist resistance cell. He is guided first by a friendly journeyman there, who in turn introduces Stach to the beautiful Dorota (Urszula Modrzyńska). An outsider, Jasio Krone (Tadeusz Janczar), the temperamental son of an elderly veteran, is initially reluctant to join the struggle but finally commits himself, running relief operations in the Jewish ghetto during the uprising there.

Cast
 Tadeusz Łomnicki as Stach Mazur
 Urszula Modrzyńska as Dorota
 Tadeusz Janczar as Jasio Krone
 Janusz Paluszkiewicz as Sekuła
 Ryszard Kotys as Jacek (credited as Ryszard Kotas)
 Roman Polanski as Mundek

Production

The first film of Wajda’s “famous war trilogy”, A Generation, was his debut directorial effort at age twenty-seven. Under the influence of the Italian neorealists, Wajda and his production team routinely shot outdoor sequences in less than optimal light and weather conditions, violating earlier Polish production precepts. Wajda recalled:

Because at the time it wasn't possible to adapt machine guns to shoot blanks, all shots of automatic weapons were done with live ammunition shot into sandbags off-screen.

A Polish film production executive reviewing the completed film was troubled by some of the brutal depictions of violence, and additionally, that the hero is portrayed as a disaffected proletariat. Despite these objections, A Generation was approved for release. It opened in Warsaw on January 25, 1955.

Critical Assessment  

Though Wajda would soon be recognized as a leading figure in the Polish Film School, the reaction to his debut picture was “generally cool.” The influence of neorealism was widely noted disapprovingly as a departure from Polish “orthodox cinematic treatments."

Bohdan Czeszko’s autobiographical novel Pokolenie, on which the film is based, concerns his activity in the armed resistance associated with the communist Polish Workers' Party (PPR) against Nazi occupation forces during World War II. Wadja, a member of the PPR since 1948, had at the time of his application to the Łódź Film School in 1950 declared: “Beside talent and a sense of reality, a film director must have a Marxist attitude towards life and art.”

Historians Dorata Niemitz and Stefan Steinberg write: 

Biographer Boleslaw Michalek notes that “in one of the tenants” of the late Stalinist era A Generation depicts Polish nationalists “collaborating almost overtly” with the German occupiers. He adds:

DVD
A box set of the Three War Films was released by The Criterion Collection. A Generation includes an exclusive interview with the director and film critic Jerzy Płażewski, as well as Wajda's 1951 film school short Ceramics from Iłża (Ceramika Iłżecka), production photos, publicity stills, posters, and original artwork by the director and an essay by film scholar Ewa Mazierska.

Footnotes

Sources 
Michalek, Boleslaw. 1973. The Cinema of Andrzej Wajda. The Tanvity Press. A. S. Barnes and Company. New York. 
Niemitz, Dorata and Steinberg, Stefan. 2016. Polish film and theatre director Andrzej Wajda dead at 90. World Socialist Web Site, 14 October, 2016. https://www.wsws.org/en/articles/2016/10/14/wajd-o14.html Retrieved 04 July, 2022.

External links
 
 
A Generation: Wajda on War an essay by Ewa Mazierska at the Criterion Collection

1955 films
Films based on Polish novels
Polish black-and-white films
Films directed by Andrzej Wajda
Films set in 1942
Films set in Warsaw
Films shot in Warsaw
1950s Polish-language films
Polish war drama films
1950s war drama films
1955 directorial debut films
1955 drama films
Polish World War II films
Warsaw Ghetto Uprising
Films about Polish resistance during World War II